Los Medanos College (LMC) is a public community college in Pittsburg, California. Established in 1974, LMC has an extension in Brentwood and is part of the Contra Costa Community College District.

History
The name, meaning "inland sand dunes" in Spanish, refers to the sand dunes that characterize its location in eastern Contra Costa County along the Sacramento River and in the foothills of Mt. Diablo. Opened in 1974, the college is part of Contra Costa Community College District, along with Contra Costa College and Diablo Valley College. Enrollment was 8,658 students in Spring 2017. In 2022, graduation was held for the first time since 2020.

Academics
There were 35 associate degrees and 23 certificates of achievement available in the 2011-2012 academic year.

Facilities
Several notable programs include:
Fire Academy (approved by the California State Fire Marshal)
Honors Transfer Program
Puente: improving college success and accessibility for Latino students
MESA (Math, Engineering, Science Achievement Program): facilitating transfer to four-year institutions with majors and baccalaureate degrees in science, engineering, computer science and other math-based fields.
Umoja Scholars: focuses on enriching, fostering, and nurturing the educational experience of African American students.
AVID (Advancement Via Individual Determination):  prepares students to transfer to a four-year school.
PTEC (Process Technology): aids and prepares students for a career in chemical processing and oil refinery work.

Notable alumni
 Ty Carter, United States Army Staff Sergeant and Medal of Honor recipient
 Lester Conner (born 1959), former NBA player and assistant coach
 Anthony C. Ferrante, film director, producer and writer
 Octavio Guzman, USL Pro soccer player
 Jack Larscheid, former NFL player
 Sterling Moore, NFL player
 Dave Tollefson, former NFL player
 Rich Waltz, television play-by-play commentator for the Miami Marlins baseball team

References

External links

 

California Community Colleges
Universities and colleges in Contra Costa County, California
Pittsburg, California
Brentwood, California
Schools accredited by the Western Association of Schools and Colleges
Educational institutions established in 1974
1974 establishments in California